

2nd Fighter Division (2. Jagd Division) was one of the primary divisions of the German Luftwaffe in World War II.  It was formed 1 May 1942 in Stade The Division was disbanded on 8 May 1945. The Division was subordinated to XII. Fliegerkorps (May 1942 – September 1943), I. Jagdkorps (September 1943 – January 1945) and IX (J) Fliegerkorps (January 1945 – May 1945).

Commanding officers
Generalleutnant Walter Schwabedissen, 1 May 1942 – 30 September 1943
Generalmajor Max Ibel, 1 October 1943 – 1 February 1945
Oberst Gustav Rödel, 1 February 1945 – May 1945

Subordinated units
Lw.Sanitäts-Abt./2. Jagddivision (1 May 1942 – 8 May 1945) 
Jagdfliegerführer 2 (1 December 1943 – 31 December 1944) 
Jagdabschnittsführer Dänemark (1 September 1943 – 8 May 1945) 
Jagdfliegerführer Deutsche Bucht (1 September 1943 – 31 December 1943) 
 Luftnachrichten-Regiment 202 (1 May 1942 – 8 May 1945)
 Luftnachrichten-Regiment 212 (1 May 1942 – 8 May 1945)
 Luftnachrichten-Regiment 222 (1 May 1942 – 8 May 1945)
 Luftnachrichten-Regiment 232 (1 May 1942 – 8 May 1945)

See also
Luftwaffe Organisation

References

Air divisions of the Wehrmacht Luftwaffe
Articles which contain graphical timelines
Military units and formations established in 1942
Military units and formations disestablished in 1945